Mael Macduach (died 920) was King of Uí Fiachrach Aidhne.

Sub anno 920, the Annals of the Four Masters states  Mael-micduach, lord of Aidhne, was slain by the foreigners. Aedh, son of Lonan O'Guaire, Tanist of Aidhne, died.

References

 Irish Kings and High-Kings, Francis John Byrne (2001), Dublin: Four Courts Press, 
 Annals of Ulster at CELT: Corpus of Electronic Texts at University College Cork

People from County Galway
10th-century Irish monarchs
937 deaths
Year of birth unknown